Especially For Youth (often abbreviated as EFY) is a week-long youth-oriented seminar focused on fellowship and teaching the principles of the Church of Jesus Christ of Latter-day Saints (LDS Church). It is run by Brigham Young University's (BYU) Continuing Education (CE) and is the largest church-oriented summer camp, attracting over 50,000 attendees every year at locations around the world.

Structure 
Attendance is open to all youth aged 14 to 18. Sessions, which are primarily held in the United States, follow a common curriculum created by members of the LDS Church. Sessions take place during the summer months in order to coincide with the summer break practiced by many schools. The program is led by Latter-day Saint young adults who serve as counselors for the youth during the sessions. Many of the speakers are selected from the LDS Church's Seminary and Institute program or from the faculty of BYU and its sister institutions in Idaho and Hawaii. All sessions in the United States and Canada are organized and managed by the EFY office on the BYU campus in Provo, Utah, where it is part of BYU's CE, with sessions elsewhere organized by local organizing committees and area authorities.

EFY states that its mission is to help participants "come unto Christ".

History of EFY 
EFY was created by Ronald C. Hills in 1976 when 172 youth and 15 counselors met for the first session of the summer program. Then-Commissioner of Church Education Jeffrey R. Holland, now of the Quorum of the Twelve Apostles, was one of the banquet speakers at the founding session. The next year, attendance rose to 863 youth.  As of 2005, the total number of participants who had attended EFY over the years was 409,484. John Bytheway wrote his Masters Thesis at BYU on the early years of EFY. In 1999, Michael R. Hicks composed The EFY Medley, which up to 2012 became one of the main songs sung at every session of EFY. As of August 2012, JD Hucks was the current program director.

Global expansion 

Between 2006 and 2011, the EFY program expanded to more parts of the world. In 2006, EFY expanded outside of the United States and Canada for the first time, with sessions in England, Germany, Mexico, and Sweden. Further expansion followed in 2009, with EFY sessions held for the first time in Spain, Italy, France and Guatemala. In 2010, the first EFY sessions were held in Australia, New Zealand, Portugal, Cape Verde, Norway, Netherlands, Tahiti, El Salvador, and Honduras. Puerto Rico hosted an EFY session in 2011.

For the Strength of Youth Conferences 
Beginning in 2012 most international locations began holding For the Strength of Youth (FSY) conferences, which were organized through local area presidencies, rather than through BYU. Then, after implementation initially being delayed from 2020 by the COVID-19 pandemic, in 2022, EFY started facilitating FSY conferences more broadly as a standard part of the LDS Church's youth program.

Locations of EFY 

The traditional overnight-stay EFY programs are normally held on college campuses. BYU is the largest destination, hosting about 13,000 participants each summer. In some limited situations EFY has been held in a hotel rather than on a university campus. The stay-at-home programs which do not involve overnight accommodations are often held at local church stake centers.

Sessions of EFY have been held in the following nations:

There are also a number of nations that haven't hosted an EFY session, but have been invited to participate in sessions in other nations. These nations include:

: As of 2009, officially participated within sessions held in the United Kingdom.
/: Officially participate within the session held in Germany in 2010.
//: Officially participate within the session held in Norway in 2010.
: (Dutch speaking) Officially participate with the session held in the Netherlands in 2010 and 2012.

EFY sessions in Latin America began in Guatemala in 2009 and are now running as FSY conferences in the Central America region, Mexico and other South American countries. FSY conferences are officially sanctioned and run by the LDS Church.

EFY yearly themes 
In 1982, EFY introduced its first annual theme. Since then, a theme and a scripture have set the tone for each EFY Session. In 2018 they have done LDS church related talks that also set the tone.

 1982: The Time Has Come
 1983: Ascending Together
 1984: Discovering New Horizons
 1985: Let Your Light Shine
 1986: Lovin' Life
 1987: Sailin' Home
 1988: Win the Race
 1989: Forever, My Friend
 1990: Learning For Myself
 1991: Walk With Me
 1992: Of One Heart
 1993: Sharing the Light
 1994: Serving With Strength
 1995: Return With Honor
 1996: Living the Legacy
 1997: Treasure the Truth
 1998: Joy in the Journey
 1999: A Season for Courage
 2000: Forward With Faith
 2001: Remember the Promise
 2002: We Believe
 2003: Look and Live
 2004: Stand in the Light
 2005: A More Excellent Way
 2006: The Greatest Gift
 2007: Power In Purity
 2008: Steady and Sure
 2009: Be Thou An Example
 2010: Courage to Stand Strong
 2011: Believe. Hope. Endure.
 2012: Arise and Shine Forth
 2013: Firm in the Faith
 2014: Anxiously Engaged
 2015: Here Am I
 2016: What Matters Most
 2017: The Way to Become
 2018: Choose Joy
 2019: Trust With All Thine Heart
 2020: Not held, due to COVID-19
 2021: A Witness Of My Own
 2022: Wait On The Lord

EFY schedule 
Each day follows a schedule of devotionals, gospel study, session director morningsides, journal time, and personal scripture study. There are little if any changes between each of the nations who hold sessions of EFY, mostly in the schedule of the Overnight and Stay-at-Home program.

Schedule changes have been made over the years.  In the late 1990s the schedule involved three dances (on Monday, Wednesday and Friday) and it also involved scheduled exercise time each morning.  There have also been various shortened versions offered, at times involving a three-day schedule and currently there is the EFY Express which involves a one-day program.  Since the EFY Express one-day programs all occur within a day they can be held during the school year.

Adventure-based sister programs 
BYU–Idaho hosts three EFY-like programs that encompass a significant outdoors component. These programs include Adventure for Youth, Outdoor Youth Adventures, and Youth for Excellence.

References

External links 
Official websites by location. (Many of the following have switched over to the officially sanctioned "FSY" conferences).
Americas United States & Canada  Mexico  Guatemala  Brazil  Argentina
Europe United Kingdom & Ireland  France  Germany  Spain  Italy  Portugal  Norway  The Netherlands
Australia & The Pacific Sydney 2010  Perth 2010  Brisbane 2011  Melbourne 2011  Tahiti
Asia & Africa South Korea  Cape Verde

1976 in Christianity
Recurring events established in 1976
Youth conferences
Young people and the Church of Jesus Christ of Latter-day Saints
Latter Day Saint conferences